The 2018 Arab Junior Athletics Championships was the eighteenth edition of the international athletics competition for under-20 athletes from Arab countries. It took place between 19–22 April at the Baccalaureat School in Amman, Jordan. It was the second time that Jordan hosted the event after Amman in 2012. A total of 44 athletics events were contested, 22 for men and 22 for women.

Medal summary

Men

Women

Medal table

References

Arab Junior Athletics Championships
International athletics competitions hosted by Jordan
Sports competitions in Amman
Arab Junior Athletics Championships
Arab Junior Athletics Championships
Arab Junior Athletics Championships